Richard James Page (born May 16, 1953) is an American musician who is best known as the lead singer and bassist of 1980s band Mr. Mister. The band's hits include "Broken Wings" and "Kyrie". Page has also sung in other bands, been a solo artist, written songs for other artists, and worked as a background singer for other artists.

Early life
Page graduated from Central High School in Phoenix, Arizona. His mother worked as the Assistant Director of the Phoenix Boys Choir, while his father was a musical director at a Phoenix church. During high school, Page performed in school musicals such as Oliver! Page cited that his musical influences at this stage included The Beatles and The Beach Boys. Immediately following his high school graduation, he moved to Hollywood.

Career
In Los Angeles, Page and Steve George, a friend from Phoenix, “knocked around the LA music scene, eventually working with topflight acts like REO Speedwagon, Andy Gibb, Al Jarreau, and Kenny Loggins.” Page turned down an offer to be the lead singer for the bands Chicago and Toto. Page's first major band, Pages, was formed with Steve George in the late 1970s.

After producing three "Pages" albums, Page and George formed Mr. Mister along with Steve Farris and Pat Mastelotto. Page was on vocals/bass, George handled keyboards, Farris played guitar, and Mastelotto was on drums. Page is best known for his work with Mr. Mister. The band's first album was I Wear The Face (1984). Page has said that in this album the band was "just getting together and figuring out" how they wanted to sound.

As frontman for Mr. Mister, Page scored two consecutive Hot 100 No. 1's with the singles "Broken Wings" and "Kyrie", both of which Page composed in collaboration with his cousin, John Lang. In 1985, both songs appeared on Mr. Mister's breakthrough second album, Welcome to the Real World, which reached No. 1 on the albums charts. The group was nominated for several Grammy Awards, including Best Pop Band in 1986. The band scored another hit with "Is It Love" (1986), which reached no. 8 in the charts.

Mr. Mister's third album, Go On… was released in 1987. In an interview, Page said that the band "tried many new and different sounds and ideas" and that it included some of the band's best songwriting. Before breaking up on September 25, 1990, the group recorded a fourth Mr. Mister album, Pull, in 1989. The album was not released until 2010.  Page has described "Pull" (2010) as the group's "most experimental album."

Many of Page's songs for Mr. Mister, and many of his solo numbers, were co-written with Steve George and John Lang.

Page has also been a solo artist, and he has worked as a background singer for other artists and bands. He has written songs for popular artists such as Barbra Streisand, Celine Dion, Dionne Warwick, and Josh Groban, among others.

Page released his first solo album, Shelter Me, in 1996. It featured the singles "The Best Thing" and "My Oxygen", a remake of Nik Kershaw's hit.

Based on a recommendation by his friend, songwriter Richard Marx, Ringo Starr approached Page to join his 11th All-Starr Band and, in the summer of 2010, they embarked on a 32-date U.S. tour; in 2011 they embarked on a 40-date Europe tour. Page also toured with Ringo's 12th All-Starr Band in the summer of 2012, 2013, and 2017.

Personal life
Page and his wife, Linda, have four children.

Discography

Solo albums
Shelter Me (1996)
Peculiar Life (2010)
Songs from the Sketchbook (2012)
Goin' South (2015)

Live albums
Solo Acoustic (2011) (DVD/CD)

with Pages
Pages (1978)
Future Street (1979)
Pages (1981)

with Mr. Mister
 I Wear the Face (1984)
 Welcome to the Real World (1985)
 Go On... (1987)
 Pull (2010)

with 3rd Matinee
Meanwhile (1994)

Notable album appearances
1979: Keep the Fire – Kenny Loggins (background vocals)
1980: Hi Infidelity – REO Speedwagon (background vocals)
1981: Runaway – Bill Champlin; on "Satisfaction" and "Gotta Get Back to Love" (background vocals)
1981: Breakin' Away – Al Jarreau (background vocals)
1981: Sometimes Late at Night – Carole Bayer Sager (background vocals)
1982: Friends in Love – Dionne Warwick (background vocals)
1982: Jon Stevens – Jon Stevens (background vocals)
1982: Three Lock Box – Sammy Hagar (background vocals)
1983: Caught in the Game – Survivor (background vocals)
1983: Shout at the Devil – Mötley Crüe (background vocals)
1983: A Christmas Album – Amy Grant (background vocals)
1983: Bent Out of Shape - Rainbow (backing vocals) "Street of Dreams"
1984: Primitive - Neil Diamond
1984: Isolation – Toto (background vocals)
1984: Stay Hungry – Twisted Sister (background vocals)
1984: "High Crime" – Al Jarreau (background vocals)
1984: Straight Ahead – Amy Grant (background vocals); on "It's Not a Song"
1985: Finder of Lost Loves – Dionne Warwick (background vocals)
1985: Vox Humana – Kenny Loggins (background vocals and accompanying vocals)
1985: Rhythm of the Night – DeBarge; on "Who's Holding Donna Now" (background vocals)
1985: Unguarded – Amy Grant; on "I Love You" and "Sharayah" (background vocals)
1986: Something to Talk About – Anne Murray; on "Now and Forever (You and Me)"  (background vocals)
1986: The Collection – Amy Grant; on "Stay for Awhile"  (background vocals)
1986: David Foster – David Foster; on "Who's Gonna Love You Tonight"
1987: Reservations for Two – Dionne Warwick; on "No One in the World" (background vocals)
1988: Back to Avalon – Kenny Loggins (background vocals)
1988: Shadow and Light – Joe Zawinul; (lead vocal on "The Immigrants")
1989: Slip of the Tongue – Whitesnake; on "Now You're Gone" (background vocals)
1990: Conserve our world – Marc Jordan (background vocals)
1992: Kingdom of Desire – Toto; on "2 Hearts" and "Kingdom of Desire" (background vocals)
1995: I'll Lead You Home – Michael W. Smith (background vocals)
1999: Mindfields – Toto; on "Mindfields" (background vocals)
2000: Birdland - Masanori & LA Allstars (lead vocal on "Green Flower Street")
2001: Until the End of Time - Tupac Shakur (accompanying vocals on "Until the End of Time")
2002: Familiar to Me – Joe Zawinul; (lead vocal on  "Faces and Places")
2003: Closer – Josh Groban (background vocals)
2005: The Day After Yesterday; duet with Rick Springfield on his cover of "Broken Wings"

References

External links
Official home page 
Mr. Mister site – Page biography & detailed discography
[ List of appearances] – provided by AllMusic

Living people
Songwriters from Iowa
American male singers
American rock bass guitarists
American male bass guitarists
Singers from Arizona
People from Keokuk, Iowa
People from Los Angeles
Songwriters from Arizona
Singers from Iowa
Mr. Mister members
Guitarists from Arizona
Guitarists from Iowa
20th-century American bass guitarists
20th-century American male musicians
Ringo Starr & His All-Starr Band members
1953 births